Pastrami on rye is a sandwich that was popularized in the Jewish kosher delicatessens of New York City. It was first created in 1888 by Sussman Volk, who served it at his deli on Delancey Street in New York City.

History

Sussman Volk immigrated from Lithuania in the late 1800s. He opened a small butcher shop on New York's Lower East Side. He befriended another immigrant, from Romania, whom he allowed to store meat in his large icebox. In exchange for his kindness, the friend gave the recipe for pastrami to Volk, who began to serve it to his customers. It proved so popular that in 1888, Volk opened a delicatessen at 88 Delancey Street, one of the first delis in New York City, where he served the meat on rye bread. 

It became a favorite at other delis, served on rye bread and topped with spicy brown mustard. Delis in New York City, like Katz's Delicatessen, have become known for their pastrami on rye sandwiches. In her description of the book on Katz's, Florence Fabricant, the noted food critic for the New York Times, described the volume "as overstuffed as Katz's pastrami on rye."

The pastrami on rye sandwich has come to be a symbol of the classic New York Jewish deli, being featured in delis around the world attempting to recreate the ambience of the original New York delis, in cities such as Los Angeles, Buenos Aires, Boca Raton, Florida, and San Diego, California. The classic, which the Wall Street Journal  called New York's "signature sandwich", consists simply of sliced pastrami, placed on rye bread, and topped with spicy brown mustard. It is usually accompanied by a Kosher dill pickle on the side.

Notable delis and restaurants

 Canter's – Fairfax District, Los Angeles
 Carnegie Deli – Midtown Manhattan
 Dunn's – Montreal, Quebec
 Katz's Delicatessen – Lower East Side, Manhattan
 Langer's Deli – Westlake, Los Angeles
 Second Avenue Deli – Murray Hill, Manhattan
 Schwartz's – Montreal, Quebec

Variations
Corned beef and pastrami on rye may be prepared using rye bread, pastrami, corned beef, cole slaw, and Russian dressing. Preparation involves placing both meats on a slice of rye bread and topping it with coleslaw. Russian dressing may be added to the top slice of bread.

Pastrami, lettuce, and tomato (PLT) may be prepared using two slices of toasted sourdough bread, mayonnaise, pastrami, lettuce, tomato slices. Preparation involves placing the pastrami on a toasted slice of sourdough bread and topping it with the lettuce and tomato slices. Mayonnaise may be spread on the second slice of sourdough, and placed on top of the sandwich.

See also

 American Jewish cuisine
 Beef on weck
 List of American sandwiches
 List of sandwiches
 Montreal-style smoked meat
 Reuben sandwich
 Roast beef sandwich
 Sailor sandwich, which also combines pastrami and rye bread

References

Further reading

External links

American sandwiches
Ashkenazi Jewish cuisine
Cuisine of New York City
Beef dishes
Rye-based dishes
American fast food
Hot sandwiches